Events from the year 1795 in Russia

Incumbents
 Monarch – Catherine II

Events
 Third Partition of Poland

Establishments
 The Vilna Governorate, replacing the Grodno Governorate
 National Library of Russia
 New Russia (trading post)

Births

 Anna Pavlovna of Russia (1795-1865) - queen of the Netherlands
 Varvara Annenkova (1795-1866) - poet
 Prince Okropir of Georgia (1795-1857) - Georgian prince
 Mikhail Khomutov (1795-1864) - general
 Maria Lvova-Sinetskaya (1795-1875) - actress
 Hillel Paritcher (1795-1864) - Chabad rabbi

Deaths

 Aleksey Antropov (1716-1795) - painter
 Ivan Betskoy (1704-1795) - education reformer
 Gerasim Izmailov (circa 1745 - 1795 or after) - navigator
 Grand Duchess Olga Pavlovna of Russia - daughter of Paul I of Russia
 Mark Poltoratsky (1729-1795) - singer, founder of Poltoratsky family
 Grigory Shelikhov (1747-1795) - merchant who founded first permanent Russian settlement in North America

References

1795 in Russia
Years of the 18th century in the Russian Empire